Sir Edward Harvey (1783–1865) was a British Royal Navy admiral.

Edward Harvey may also refer to:
Edward Harvey (politician) (1658–1736), MP for Clitheroe 
Edward Harvey (British Army officer) (1718–1778), British Army general

See also
Ted Harvey, American politician